Jessica Marie Susanne Ohlson (born 12 June 1990) is a Swedish politician and lawyer. She was chairman of the Sweden Democratic Youth (SDU) from September 2015 to 2017 and served as party secretary for Alternative for Sweden from 2018 to 2020. Ohlson is an assistant lawyer at her father's law firm Lars Ohlson AB in Nyköping.

Early life 

Jessica Ohlson was born on 12 June 1990 in Stigtomta, Södermanland.

Personal life 

Ohlson runs her own firm and a limited company called Min Galopphäst Sverige AB, with a focus on equestrian sports.

References 

1990 births
Living people
People from Nyköping Municipality
21st-century Swedish women politicians
Alternative for Sweden politicians
Uppsala University alumni